Chongchuan District is one of three urban districts of Nantong, Jiangsu province, China.

The postal code for Chongchuan District is 226001 and the telephone code is 0513.

Administrative divisions
In the present, Chongchuan District has 13 subdistricts and 1 town.

13 Subdistricts

1 Town
 Xinkai

References

External links
 Official Website

County-level divisions of Jiangsu
Nantong